Thurstaston is a village in Wirral, Merseyside, England.  It contains twelve buildings on the National Heritage List for England, designated as listed buildings. Of these, two are Grade II*, the middle of the three grades, and the others are Grade II, the lowest grade. The buildings include a country house and a church, both with associated structures; farm buildings; a lodge; a war memorial; and a former school.

Key

Buildings

References

Citations

Sources

Listed buildings in Merseyside
Lists of listed buildings in Merseyside